Aotea / Great Barrier Local Board is one of the 21 local boards of the Auckland Council, and is represented by the council's Waitematā and Gulf Ward councillor.

The board's administrative area covers whole of the Great Barrier Island.

The board is governed by five board members elected at-large. The inaugural members were elected in the nationwide 2010 local elections, coinciding with the introduction of the Auckland Council.

2016–19 term

The board's term currently runs from the 2016 local body elections to the local body elections in 2019. The current board members are:
Izzy Fordham (Chair), Independent
Luke Coles (Deputy Chair), None 
Jeff Cleave, None
Sue Daly, Independent
Shirley Johnson, None

References

Great Barrier Island
Local boards of the Auckland Region